A Dual Board or Two Tier system is a corporate structure system that consists of two bodies i.e. the Council of Delegates to govern the Board of Directors and the Board of Directors to manage a corporation. The roles and relationships between the two bodies vary across countries. The structure is composed of two bodies, the "Management Body", and the "Governance Body" each of these have different roles.

In Germany, the Dual Board system is prescribed for corporations that are listed on the stock market (e.g., Lufthansa, and Adidas). It is argued that this approach results in and better serves the objectives of a social market system.

Using a two tier system might also result in "more monitoring" and "less aggressive performance targets". It might also be "less efficient" from a financial market perspective. It has been suggested that financial efficiency may be impeded by reduced communication, and the higher costs of running a Dual Board.

History
The two tier system was first adopted in German companies in the 19th century, and it became compulsory after the Second World War. Other countries that adopted a two tier approach include Finland, China, and the Netherlands. The Singapore Manufacturing Federation, recently introduced a governance body as well. In the European Union, 10 countries require the two-tier approach,  8 countries require the single tier board approach, and 9 countries allow the use of either.

Management Body
The Management Body meets frequently (often weekly) to deal with operational issues. Some contracting decisions and strategic planning decisions may have to be approved by the Governance Body. members of the Management Body are appointed by the members of the Governance Body (see below).

Composition of "Management Body"

Head of Board of Directors

Chairperson cum Managing Director cum Chief Executive Officer shall be selected and appointed by the Council of Delegates

Vice Chairperson cum Deputy  Managing Director cum Co-Chief Executive Officer shall be selected and appointed by the Council of Delegates

Members of Board of Directors

The number of Executive  Director cum Chief [Specialisation] Officer shall be decided and appointed by the Council of Delegates

Note :- Specialisation implies finance, technology, marketing etc.

Governance Body
The governance body is usually elected by the Shareholders. Composition varies across jurisdictions; its members are usually independent of the executive but it can include employee representatives in some countries. Generally, the governance body guides and monitors the management body.

Composition of "Governance Body"

Head of Council of Delegates

Active Delegate shall be elected by the equity shareholders 
Co-Active Delegate shall be elected by the equity shareholders 

Members of Council of Delegates

Executive  Delegates shall be elected by the equity shareholders 
Non Executive Delegates shall be elected by equity shareholders and nominated by the national government,  provincial government, officers union of that corporate establishment and employees union of that corporate establishment

Types of Delegates

Residential Delegate
Whole time Delegate
Independent Delegate
Alternate Delegate
Women Delegate
Additional Delegate
Nominee Delegate
Small Shareholder Delegate
Shadow Delegate
Casual Vaccancy Delegate
Any other type of "Delegate" to be included

  The governance body is involved in long term  strategic planning. Another task that the Governance Body is in charge of is the selection, dismissal, and designation of the members in the Management Body, to "ensure a long term succession planning".

Cooperation Between bodies
The Management Body has to closely cooperate with the Governance Body to develop the business strategy, this is done by creating a steady flow of information between the two. The information flow would include risk management, business development and any differences of the development of the business compared to the initial plan. Open discussions between members of the boards are also key to the functionality of the business under a Two Tier System, because these must exchange information frequently.

Country systems
Countries with two-tier boards include:
Germany
Austria
Poland
Indonesia
China

Countries where the option of a two-tier board is provided by law include:
Belgium
Italy
France
Romania

See also
 European Company Statute
 Supervisory Board
 Executive Director

References

Board of directors